is a Japanese manga series written and illustrated by Tomo Sawara. It has been serialized in Shogakukan's seinen manga magazine Monthly Big Comic Spirits since September 2016.

Publication
Written and illustrated by Keita Yatera, Hen na Mono Mikke! has been serialized in Shogakukan's seinen manga magazine Monthly Big Comic Spirits since September 27, 2016. Shogakukan collected its chapters in ten tankōbon volumes. The first volume was released on July 12, 2017. As of November 10, 2022, eight volumes have been released.

Volume list

References

External links
 

Seinen manga
Shogakukan manga